Acanthocephala latipes is a species of leaf-footed bug in the family Coreidae. It is found in Central and South America.

References

 

Hemiptera of Central America
Hemiptera of South America
Insects described in 1782
latipes